Severinus is a name held by multiple people.

Severinus (consul 461), Roman politician
Severinus, Exuperius, and Felician, saints
Severinus of Bordeaux, saint
Severinus of Cologne, saint
Severinus of Noricum, saint
Severinus of Sanseverino, saint
Severinus Boethius, Roman consul and philosopher (and saint)
Pope Severinus, pope
Severinus of Saxony, prince
Severinus Desiré Emanuels

See also
 Severin (disambiguation)
 Severina (disambiguation)
 Severina (disambiguation)
 Severus (disambiguation)